Chongos Alto District is one of twenty-eight districts of the province Huancayo in Peru. Is located in the Department of Junin, part of the Junín Region.

Geography 
The Chunta mountain range traverses the district. Some of the highest peaks of the district are listed below:

The largest lakes of the district are Aqchiqucha, Quylluqucha, Walsaqucha, Wich'iqucha, Yuraqqucha and Ñawinqucha some of which belong to the largest lakes of Peru.

References